Deir as-Sudan is a Palestinian town in the Ramallah and al-Bireh Governorate, located 20 kilometers Northwest of Ramallah in the northern West Bank. According to the Palestinian Central Bureau of Statistics (PCBS), the town had a population of approximately 1,991 inhabitants in 2007.

Location
It is bordered by Ajjul to the east, Bani Zeid al-Sharqiya  to the north, Kafr Ein  to the west,  Umm Safa and An Nabi Salih  to the south.

History
Ceramic sherds from the Byzantine, Crusader/Ayyubid and  Mamluk eras have been found here.

Ottoman era
The population was 14 households, all Muslim. They paid a  fixed  tax rate of 33,3% on agricultural products, such as  wheat, barley, olive trees, vineyards/fruit trees, goats and beehives, in addition to occasional revenues; a total of 3,400 akçe. Pottery from the early Ottoman era have also been found here.

In 1838, it was noted as a Muslim  village in the Beni Zeid district, north of Jerusalem.

An Ottoman village list of about 1870 indicated 22 houses and a population of 90, though  the population count included  men, only.

In 1882, the  PEF's Survey of Western Palestine (SWP) described Deir es Sudan as: "A village of moderate size, with a well to the west, on the slope of a hill, with olive-groves round it."

In 1896 the population of Der es-sudan was estimated to be about 153 persons.

British Mandate era
In the 1922 census of Palestine, conducted by the British Mandate authorities, the village, named Dair Al-Sudan, had a population of 173, all Muslim,  increasing in the  1931 census to 243 Muslims, in 53 houses.

Of this, 2,416 dunams were plantations and irrigable land, 841 were for cereals, while  were built-up (urban) land.

Jordanian era
In the wake of the 1948 Arab–Israeli War, and after the 1949 Armistice Agreements, Deir as-Sudan came under Jordanian rule.

The Jordanian census of 1961 found 486 inhabitants in Deir as-Sudan.

1967-present
Since the Six-Day War in 1967, Deir as-Sudan has been under Israeli occupation.

After the 1995 accords, 57.2% of the village's total area has been defined as Area A land, 
6.5% as Area B land, while the remaining 36.3% is Area C.

References

Bibliography

External links
 Welcome To Dayr al-Sudan
Deir as-Sudan, Welcome to Palestine 
Survey of Western Palestine, Map 14:  IAA, Wikimedia commons 
 Deir as Sudan village (fact sheet),   Applied Research Institute–Jerusalem (ARIJ)
 Deir as Sudan village profile, ARIJ
 Deir as Sudan  aerial photo,  ARIJ
 Locality Development Priorities and Needs in Deir as Sudan Village, ARIJ

Villages in the West Bank
Ramallah and al-Bireh Governorate
Municipalities of the State of Palestine